Kenneth Martin Lindsay (16 September 1897 – 4 March 1991) was a Labour Party politician from the United Kingdom who joined the breakaway National Labour group. He was the final Member of Parliament to be elected by the single transferable vote.

Standing as a Labour candidate, he unsuccessfully contested the Oxford constituency at the 1924 by-election, Harrow at the 1924 general election and Worcester in 1929.  When the Labour Party split in 1931 and Prime Minister Ramsay MacDonald formed a National Government with the Conservative Party, Lindsay followed MacDonald into the breakaway National Labour group.

In 1933, Craigie Aitchison, the National Labour Member of Parliament (MP) for Kilmarnock, was appointed as a judge, vacating his seat.  At the resulting by-election on 2 November, Lindsay defeated the Labour candidate, and was re-elected comfortably at the 1935 general election.  He held the seat until 1945, later sitting as a National Independent.

He was Civil Lord of the Admiralty from 1935 to 1937, and then Parliamentary Secretary to the Board of Education from 1937 to 1940.

He did not contest Kilmarnock at the 1945 general election, but was elected as an independent member for the Combined English Universities, holding the seat until the university constituencies were abolished for the 1950 general election.

Bibliography 
 Social progress and educational waste (1926)
 English education (1941)
 Towards a European parliament (1958)
 European assemblies: the experimental period, 1949–1959 (1960)
 The first twenty-five years of the Anglo-Israel Association (1973)

References

External links 
 

1897 births
1991 deaths
National Labour (UK) politicians
Independent members of the House of Commons of the United Kingdom
Members of the Parliament of the United Kingdom for Scottish constituencies
Members of the Parliament of the United Kingdom for the Combined English Universities
UK MPs 1931–1935
UK MPs 1935–1945
UK MPs 1945–1950
Lords of the Admiralty
Presidents of the Oxford Union
Ministers in the Chamberlain wartime government, 1939–1940
Ministers in the Chamberlain peacetime government, 1937–1939
Labour Party (UK) parliamentary candidates